Damned Devotion is the fifth regular studio album by American musician Joan As Police Woman, released on February 9, 2018 by PIAS Recordings.

Release
On November 2, 2017, Wasser announced the release of her new album, along with the single "Warning Bell".

Critical reception
Damned Devotion was met with "universal acclaim" reviews from critics. At Metacritic, which assigns a weighted average rating out of 100 to reviews from mainstream publications, this release received an average score of 81 based on 11 reviews. Aggregator Album of the Year gave the release a 76 out of 100 based on a critical consensus of 12 reviews.

Track listing

Personnel
Credits are adapted from the Damned Devotion liner notes.

Musicians
 Joan Wasser – primary artist, guitar, drums, producer
 Oren Bloedow – guitar
 Parker Kindred – drums
 Benjamin Lazar Davis – bass, guitar
 Jared Samuel – keyboards

Production
 Thomas Bartlett – engineer, producer
 Dan Millice – mastering
 Luke Moellman – mixing
 Adam Sachs – engineer

Charts

References

External links

2018 albums
Joan as Police Woman albums
PIAS Recordings albums